La Stratégie: Journal d'Échecs was a French monthly chess magazine published from 1867 to 1940. One of the more famous chess serials, it was established in Paris by Jean-Louis Preti. La Stratégie had only three editors during its entire run: Preti 1867–1875, his son Numa Preti 1875–1907, and Henri Delaire 1907–1940.

References

External links
 La Stratégie, Vol. 1 at Google books
 La Stratégie, Vol. 2 at Google books

1867 establishments in France
1940 disestablishments in France
1867 in chess
1940 in chess
Chess periodicals
Chess in France
Defunct magazines published in France
Magazines published in France
French-language magazines
Magazines established in 1867
Magazines disestablished in 1940
Magazines published in Paris
Monthly magazines published in France